Euphorbia decaryi is a species of plant in the family Euphorbiaceae endemic to Madagascar.  Its natural habitats are subtropical or tropical dry forests, subtropical or tropical dry shrubland, and rocky areas. It is threatened by habitat loss.

Euphorbia decaryi is a spreading, evergreen plant, under 6" in height, and blooming April–June. Flowers are chartreuse, yellow-green, yellow, or red; female flowers carry a three-part pistil over a three-part ovary, producing three or sometimes more seeds.

References

 ZipCodeZoo entry

Endemic flora of Madagascar
decaryi
Endangered plants
Taxonomy articles created by Polbot